This timeline lists significant discoveries in physics and the laws of nature, including experimental discoveries, theoretical proposals that were confirmed experimentally, and theories that have significantly influenced current thinking in modern physics. Such discoveries are often a multi-step, multi-person process. Multiple discovery sometimes occurs when multiple research groups discover the same phenomenon at about the same time, and scientific priority is often disputed. The listings below include some of the most significant people and ideas by date of publication or experiment.

Antiquity
 460–370 BCE - Democritus: Atomism via thought experiment
 384–322 BCE - Aristotle: Aristotelian physics
 367–282 BCE - Ptolemy: Ptolemaic geocentric system, a near accurate phenomenological model of planetary motions
 250 BCE - Archimedes: Archimedes' principle
 276–194 BCE - Eratosthenes: Measurement of the circumference of the Earth
 129 BCE - Hipparchus: Determination of the precession of the equinoxes, Entire sky star catalog. 
 150–100 BCE - Unknown, possibly by Hipparchus: Invention of Astrolabe and the Antikythera mechanism, a mechanical analog computer of astronomical observations

Early Middle Ages
 500 CE - John Philoponus: Theory of impetus

16th century
 1514 - Nicolaus Copernicus: Heliocentrism
 1589 - Galileo Galilei: Galileo's Leaning Tower of Pisa experiment

17th century

 1609, 1619 - Kepler: Kepler's laws of planetary motion
 1613 - Galileo Galilei: Inertia
 1621 - Willebrord Snellius: Snell's law
 1632 - Galileo Galilei: The Galilean principle (the laws of motion are the same in all inertial frames)
 1660 - Blaise Pascal: Pascal's law
 1660 - Robert Hooke: Hooke's law
1662 - Robert Boyle: Boyle's law
 1676 - Ole Rømer: Rømer's determination of the speed of light traveling from the moons of Jupiter.
 1678 - Christiaan Huygens mathematical wave theory of light, published in his Treatise on Light
 1687 - Isaac Newton: Newton's laws of motion, and Newton's law of universal gravitation

18th century
 1782 - Antoine Lavoisier: Conservation of mass
 1785 - Charles-Augustin de Coulomb: Coulomb's inverse-square law for electric charges confirmed

19th century

 1801 - Thomas Young: Wave theory of light
 1803 - John Dalton: Atomic theory of matter
 1806 - Thomas Young: Kinetic energy
 1814 - Augustin-Jean Fresnel: Wave theory of light, optical interference
 1820 - André-Marie Ampère, Jean-Baptiste Biot, and Félix Savart: Evidence for electromagnetic interactions (Biot–Savart law)
 1824 - Nicolas Léonard Sadi Carnot: Ideal gas cycle analysis (Carnot cycle), internal combustion engine
 1826 - Ampère's circuital law
 1827 - Georg Ohm: Electrical resistance
 1831 - Michael Faraday: Faraday's law of induction
 1838 - Michael Faraday: Lines of force
 1838 - Wilhelm Eduard Weber and Carl Friedrich Gauss: Earth's magnetic field
 1842-43 - William Thomson, 1st Baron Kelvin and Julius von Mayer: Conservation of energy
 1842 - Christian Doppler: Doppler effect
 1845 - Michael Faraday: Faraday rotation (interaction of light and magnetic field)
 1847 - Hermann von Helmholtz & James Prescott Joule: Conservation of Energy 2
 1850-51 - William Thomson, 1st Baron Kelvin & Rudolf Clausius: Second law of thermodynamics
 1857-59 - Rudolf Clausius & James Clerk Maxwell: Kinetic theory of gases
 1861 - Gustav Kirchhoff: Black body
 1861-62 - Maxwell's equations
 1863 - Rudolf Clausius: Entropy
 1864 - James Clerk Maxwell: A Dynamical Theory of the Electromagnetic Field (electromagnetic radiation)
 1867 - James Clerk Maxwell: On the Dynamical Theory of Gases (kinetic theory of gases)
 1871-89 - Ludwig Boltzmann & Josiah Willard Gibbs: Statistical mechanics (Boltzmann equation, 1872)
 1873 - Maxwell: A Treatise on Electricity and Magnetism
 1884 - Boltzmann derives Stefan radiation law
 1887 - Michelson–Morley experiment
 1887 - Heinrich Rudolf Hertz: Electromagnetic waves
 1888 - Johannes Rydberg: Rydberg formula
 1889, 1892 - Lorentz-FitzGerald contraction
 1893 - Wilhelm Wien: Wien's displacement law for black-body radiation
 1895 - Wilhelm Röntgen: X-rays
 1896 - Henri Becquerel: Radioactivity
 1896 - Pieter Zeeman: Zeeman effect
 1897 - J. J. Thomson: Electron discovered

20th century

 1900 - Max Planck: Formula for black-body radiation - the quanta solution to radiation ultraviolet catastrophe
 1904 - J. J. Thomson's plum pudding model of the atom 1904 
 1905 - Albert Einstein: Special relativity, proposes light quantum (which is named the photon by GN Lewis in 1926) to explain the photoelectric effect, Brownian motion, Mass–energy equivalence
 1908 - Hermann Minkowski: Minkowski space
 1911 - Ernest Rutherford: Discovery of the atomic nucleus (Rutherford model)
 1911 - Kamerlingh Onnes: Superconductivity
 1913 - Niels Bohr: Bohr model of the atom
 1915 - Albert Einstein: General relativity
 1916 - Schwarzschild metric modeling gravity outside a large sphere
 1919 - Arthur Eddington:Light bending confirmed - evidence for general relativity
 1919-1926 - Kaluza–Klein theory proposing unification of gravity and electromagnetism
 1922 - Alexander Friedmann proposes expanding universe
 1922-37 - Friedmann–Lemaître–Robertson–Walker metric cosmological model
 1923 - Stern–Gerlach experiment
 1923 - Edwin Hubble: Galaxies discovered
 1923 - Arthur Compton: Particle nature of photons confirmed by observation of photon momentum
 1924 - Bose–Einstein statistics
 1924 - Louis de Broglie: De Broglie wave
 1925 - Werner Heisenberg: Matrix mechanics
 1925-27 - Niels Bohr & Max Planck: Quantum mechanics
 1925 - Stellar structure understood
 1926 - Fermi-Dirac Statistics
 1926 - Erwin Schrödinger: Schrödinger Equation
 1927 - Werner Heisenberg: Uncertainty principle
 1927 - Georges Lemaître: Big Bang
 1927 - Paul Dirac: Dirac equation
 1927 - Max Born interpretation of the Schrödinger equation
 1928 - Paul Dirac proposes the antiparticle
 1929 - Edwin Hubble: Expansion of the universe confirmed
 1932 - Carl David Anderson: Antimatter discovered
 1932 - James Chadwick: Neutron discovered
 1933 - Ernst Ruska: Invention of the electron microscope 
 1935 - Subrahmanyan Chandrasekhar: Chandrasekhar limit for black hole collapse
 1937 - Muon discovered by Carl David Anderson and Seth Neddermeyer
 1938 - Pyotr Kapitsa: Superfluidity discovered
 1938 - Otto Hahn, Lise Meitner and Fritz Strassmann Nuclear fission discovered
 1938-39 - Stellar fusion explains energy production in stars
 1939 - Uranium fission discovered
 1941 - Feynman path integral
 1944 - Theory of magnetism in 2D: Ising model
 1947 - C.F. Powell, Giuseppe Occhialini, César Lattes: Pion discovered
 1948 - Richard Feynman, Shinichiro Tomonaga, Julian Schwinger, Freeman Dyson: Quantum electrodynamics
 1948 - Invention of the maser and laser by Charles Townes
 1948 - Feynman diagrams
 1956 - Electron neutrino discovered
 1956-57 - Parity violation proved by Dr. Chien-Shiung Wu
 1957 - BCS theory explaining superconductivity
 1959-60 - Role of topology in quantum physics predicted and confirmed
 1962 - SU(3) theory of strong interactions
 1962 - Muon neutrino discovered
 1963 - Chien-Shiung Wu confirms the conserved vector current theory for weak interactions
 1963 - Murray Gell-Mann and George Zweig: Quarks predicted
 1964 - Bell's Theorem initiates quantitative study of quantum entanglement
 1967 - Unification of weak interaction and electromagnetism (electroweak theory)
 1967 - Solar neutrino problem found 
 1967 - Pulsars (rotating neutron stars) discovered
 1968 - Experimental evidence for quarks found
 1968 - Vera Rubin: Dark matter theories
 1970-73 - Standard Model of elementary particles invented
 1971 - Helium 3 superfluidity
 1971-75 - Michael Fisher, Kenneth G. Wilson, and Leo Kadanoff: Renormalization group
 1972 - Black Hole Entropy
 1974 - Black hole radiation (Hawking radiation) predicted
 1974 - Charmed quark discovered
 1975 - Tau lepton found
 1977 - Bottom quark found
 1977 - Anderson localization recognised (Nobel prize in 1977, Philip W. Anderson, Mott, Van Fleck)
 1980 - Strangeness as a signature of quark-gluon plasma predicted
 1980 - Richard Feynman proposes quantum computing
 1980 - Quantum Hall effect
 1981 - Alan Guth Theory of cosmic inflation proposed 
 1981 - Fractional quantum Hall effect discovered
 1983 - Simulated annealing
 1984 - W and Z bosons directly observed
 1984 - First laboratory implementation of quantum cryptography
 1987 - High-temperature superconductivity discovered in 1986, awarded Nobel prize in 1987 (J. Georg Bednorz and K. Alexander Müller)
 1989-98 - Quantum annealing 
 1993 - Quantum teleportation of unknown states proposed
 1994 - Shor's algorithm discovered, initiating the serious study of quantum computation
 1994-97 - Matrix models/M-theory
 1995 - Wolfgang Ketterle: Bose–Einstein condensate observed
 1995 - Top quark discovered
 1995-2000 - Econophysics and Kinetic exchange models of markets
 1998 - Accelerating expansion of the universe discovered by the Supernova Cosmology Project and the High-Z Supernova Search Team
 1998 - Atmospheric neutrino oscillation established
 1999 - Lene Vestergaard Hau: Slow light experimentally demonstrated

21st century

 2000 - Quark-gluon plasma found
 2000 - Tau neutrino found
 2001 - Solar neutrino oscillation observed, resolving the solar neutrino problem
 2003 - WMAP observations of cosmic microwave background
 2004 - Isolation and characterization of graphene
 2007 - Giant magnetoresistance recognized (Nobel prize, Albert Fert and Peter Grünberg)
 2008 - 16-year study of stellar orbits around Sagittarius_A* provides strong evidence for a supermassive black hole at the centre of the Milky Way galaxy
 2009 - Planck begins observations of cosmic microwave background 
 2012 - Higgs boson found by the Compact Muon Solenoid and ATLAS experiments at the Large Hadron Collider
 2015 - Gravitational waves are observed
 2016 - Topological order - topological phase transitions and order - recognized (Nobel prize, David J. Thouless, F. Duncan M. Haldane and J. Michael Kosterlitz)
 2019 - First image of a black hole

See also
 Physics
 List of timelines

References

Theoretical physics
History of science
Fundamental Discoveries